A Thiokinase is a ligase that synthesizes CoA Thioesters. They are classified under EC number 6.2, but often have primary names without "thiokinase" in the title.

Types include:
 Acetate-CoA ligase (ADP-forming)
 Butyrate-CoA ligase
 Citrate-CoA ligase
 Malate-CoA ligase
 Succinate-CoA ligase (ADP-forming)
 Succinate-CoA ligase (GDP-forming)

EC 6.2